My Kampong Days <<家在半山芭>> is the 14th co-production of MediaCorp TV and ntv7. It stars Ong Ai Leng , Wee Kheng Ming & Zen Chong as the casts of the series. It was produced in conjunction with Malaysia's 52nd Year of Independence.

Synopsis
This drama is about how neighbours live in harmony together bearing with each other attitudes, and helping each other during times of trouble.

Cast

References

Chinese-language drama television series in Malaysia
Singapore Chinese dramas
Singapore–Malaysia television co-productions
2009 Malaysian television series debuts
2009 Malaysian television series endings
2009 Singaporean television series debuts
2009 Singaporean television series endings
NTV7 original programming
Channel 8 (Singapore) original programming